31 minutos (Spanish for "31 Minutes") is the name of the first soundtrack album of the homonymous television series.

Its first edition released by the label La Oreja Records (which is discontinued in the market) in August 2003, and containing stickers and 3 videos (Bailan sin César, Lala and Tangananica Tangananá), managed to sell in Chile the 120,000 copies, surpassing records like those of the Chilean program Rojo, or Los Prisioneros, and reaching the position of a sixteenth platinum record. The double-disc prize Platinum was delivered in the television program De Pe a Pa. EMI Music Mexico reissued the CD for the Mexican Republic in 2007, and Feria Music in 2012 with a different aspect. However, when this last went bankrupt, Aplaplac, the producer of the program, went back to edit the album, and in 2014, together with No visión discos, they released the compact on vinyl.

It has been recognized on multiple occasions, for example, EMOL added the album in its selection of 35 fundamental albums of Chilean popular music.

Track listing

(*) Bold text indicates the actual songs.

(**) The names of tracks are Spanish tongue-twisters, so names may vary.

Personnel 
31 Minutos

 Pablo Ilabaca – vocals, acoustic guitar, electric guitar, keyboards, synthesizer, percussion
 Daniel Castro – vocals
 Álvaro Díaz – vocals
 Alejandra Dueñas – vocals
 Diana Massis – vocals
 Pedro Peirano – vocals
 Rodrigo Salinas – vocals

Additional musicians
 Carlos Espinoza – guitar on “Mi Muñeca me Habló” and bases on “Yo Opino”
 Erick del Valle – engineering onin “El Baño Molestoso”
 Felipe Ilabaca – bass guitar on "31 minutos"
 Pablo Aguilar – bass guitar on "Mi Muñeca me Habló"
 Fernando Aguilar – percussion on "Mi Muñeca me Habló"
 Raúl Silvestre – trombone on “Calcetín con Rombos Man”
 Sebastián Jordan – trumpet on “Calcetín con Rombos Man”

Production
 Pablo Ilabaca – Musical Producer, recording on Estudios Horripilancia
 Álvaro Díaz – Musical Producer
 Juan Manuel Egaña – Executive Producer
 Héctor Sánchez – Executive Producer
 Fernando Aguilar – recording on Multisonido, mixing on Multisonido
 Carlos Espinoza – recording on Multisonido, mixing on Multisonido
 Gonzalo González – recording on Estudios Robot Mutante
 Joaquín García – mastering on Clio
 Matías Iglesias – cover design
 Nicolás Grüm – design assistant
 Claudio Botarro – advice and graphic production
 Francisco Schultz – photos

Notes 
 On Track 31, after the goodbye of Chancho Irrarazabal there is a backwards message saying "Yo enterré a Tulio" (I Buried Tulio). This is likely a reference to The Beatles' "Strawberry Fields Forever", which contains the supposed backwards message "I buried Paul".

References

Soundtracks by Chilean artists
2003 soundtrack albums
Television soundtracks
Spanish-language soundtracks